In enzymology, a rRNA (adenine-N6-)-methyltransferase is an enzyme that catalyzes the chemical reaction

S-adenosyl-L-methionine + rRNA  S-adenosyl-L-homocysteine + rRNA containing N6-methyladenine

Thus, the two substrates of this enzyme are S-adenosyl methionine and rRNA, whereas its two products are S-adenosylhomocysteine and rRNA containing N6-methyladenine.

This enzyme belongs to the family of transferases, specifically those transferring one-carbon group methyltransferases.  The systematic name of this enzyme class is S-adenosyl-L-methionine:rRNA (adenine-N6-)-methyltransferase. Other names in common use include ribosomal ribonucleate adenine 6-methyltransferase, gene ksgA methyltransferase, ribonucleic acid-adenine (N6) methylase, ErmC 23S rRNA methyltransferase, and S-adenosyl-L-methionine:rRNA (adenine-6-N-)-methyltransferase.

Structural studies

References

 

EC 2.1.1
Enzymes of known structure